Incarceration in Canada is one of the main forms of punishment, rehabilitation, or both, for the commission of an indictable offense and other offenses.

According to Statistics Canada, as of 2018/2019 there were a total of 37,854 adult offenders incarcerated in Canadian federal and provincial prisons on an average day for an incarceration rate of 127 per 100,000 population. Of these, 23,783 were in provincial/territorial custody and 14,071 were in federal custody. 

Young offenders are covered by the Youth Criminal Justice Act (YCJA), which was enacted in 2003. In 2018/2019, an average of 716 youth between the ages of 12 and 17 were incarcerated in Canada, for a rate of 4 per 10,000 population. This number represents a 10% decrease from the previous year and a 32% decrease from 2014-2015. 

Indigenous people are vastly over-represented and make up a rising share in the Canadian prison system, making up 30.04% of the offender population in 2020, compared to 4.9% of the total population. In 2018-2019, the offender population included Caucasians at 54.2% and Black people at 7.2%; meanwhile, Asian people made up only 5.3%, thereby being vastly underrepresented compared to their share of the overall population at 17.7%.

History 
The correction system in Canada dates to French and British colonial settlement, when all crimes were deemed deserving of punishment. Such was often meted out in public, as physical pain and humiliation were the preferred forms of punishment, including whipping, branding, and pillorying. In other cases, offenders were transported to other countries and abandoned to their fate. Execution was also used as punishment for serious crimes.

In 1789, Philadelphian Quakers in the United States introduced the penitentiary as an alternative to such harsh punishment. The concept of long-term imprisonment eventually spread to England as an alternative to exiling offenders to the penal colonies, including Canada. The first penitentiary in Upper Canada (present-day Ontario) was opened in 1835 as the Kingston Penitentiary. This facility was built by the colonial government and, at the time of Confederation in 1867, it was under provincial jurisdiction (of the Province of Ontario). It came under federal responsibility with the passage of the Penitentiary Act in 1868.

In 1859, the offences punishable by death in Canada included murder, rape, treason, poisoning, or injuring a person with the intent to commit murder, mistreatment of a girl under 10 years of age, arson, among other things. As of 1869, only three offences were punishable by death: murder, rape, and treason.

The federal government opened additional penitentiaries in other parts of Canada in decades following Confederation. An increase in crime during the Great Depression saw a rapid increase in Canada's incarceration rate. The Prison for Women opened in 1934. The Archambault Commission (officially the Royal Commission to Investigate the Penal System in Canada) was established that year in response to riots, overcrowding, and strikes in Canadian prisons. The final report was published in 1938 and was the first comprehensive report in Canada to emphasize crime prevention and offender rehabilitation.

In the 1960s, new approaches to rehabilitation and reintegration were adopted. The first 'gradual release' program was introduced at Collins Bay Institution, wherein inmates were allowed to work outside the institution during the day and return in the evening. In 1969, an experimental living unit was opened at medium-security Springhill Institution in Nova Scotia, as part of a community pilot program to aid inmates in preparing themselves for "outside" life.

Capital punishment was abolished in Canada in 1976. Also in the 1960s and 1970s, various halfway houses were opened, as well as governments and community groups taking on the essential needs of ex-inmates by providing them with room and board, and often helping them find work, enrol in school, and obtain counselling services.

Division of correctional systems 

In Canada, all offenders who receive a sentence of 24 months or greater must serve their sentence in a federal correctional facility administered by the Correctional Service of Canada (CSC). Any offender who receives a sentence less than 24 months, or who is incarcerated while awaiting trial or sentencing, must serve their sentence in a provincial/territorial correctional facility.

Members of the Canadian Armed Forces who are sentenced under military law serve their sentences at detention barracks designated by the Department of National Defence. For inmates with serious mental health conditions, CSC has 5 regional treatment centres.

Additionally, CSC also provides healing lodges specifically for Indigenous offenders, designed with the intention "to address factors that led to their incarceration and prepare them for reintegration into society." CSC currently funds and/or operates 10 healing lodges across Canada, while others are operated by local Indigenous communities or partner organizations.

Security levels 
Canada's correctional system designates facilities under various security levels. Most provincial/territorial correctional facilities where offenders serve sentences of less than 24 months, or are held in pre-trial and pre-sentence custody, have cells at different security levels within the same facility.

The majority of in-custody offenders are classified as "medium security" risk.

Statistics 
Indigenous people are vastly over-represented and make up a rising share in the Canadian prison system, making up 30.04% of the offender population in 2020, compared to 4.9% of the total population. In 2018-2019, the offender population included Caucasians at 54.2% and Black people at 7.2%; meanwhile, Asian people made up only 5.3%, thereby being vastly underrepresented compared to their share of the overall Asian population at 17.7%.

Offenders with life or indeterminate sentences represents 24% of the total offender population in Canada. 70% of offenders are serving a sentence for a violent offence.

See also 
Correctional Service of Canada
Criminal sentencing in Canada
Capital punishment in Canada
Provincial correctional services in Canada
John Howard Society — Prison advocacy group

Notes